Park University is a private university in Parkville, Missouri. It was founded in 1875. 
In the fall of 2017, Park had an enrollment of 11,457 students.

History
The school which was originally called Park College was founded in 1875 by John A. McAfee on land donated by George S. Park with its initial structure being the stone hotel Park owned on the bluff above the Missouri River.

The original concept called for students to receive free tuition and board in exchange for working up to half day in the college's farm, electrical shop or printing plant.  According to the terms of the arrangement if the “Parkville Experiment” did not work out within five years, the college grounds were to revert to Park.

There were 17 students in the first school year and in the first graduation class there were five women. McAfee led until his death in 1890. His son Lowell M. McAfee became the second president of Park until stepping down in 1913. The first international student at Park University arrived in 1880 from Japan.

The defining landmark of the campus is Mackay Hall, named after Carroll County, Illinois banker Duncan Mackay who donated $25,000 in materials for the structure shortly before his death.  The building was constructed using limestone mined on the campus grounds and built with the labor of students. Construction began in 1883 and was finished by 1893.  Today the building is the main focal point of the campus and dominates the hillside, overlooking the town of Parkville.  It is on the National Register of Historic Places.

For many decades the school was affiliated with the Presbyterian Church but it no longer has that affiliation. The college has had a relationship with the military since 1889. However, the relationship was greatly expanded in the late 1960s with the establishment of a Military Degree Completion Program and later in 1972 with the Military Resident Center System. Park's total enrollment has grown from its small base since 1996 when it first began offering online courses.  In 2000, it was renamed Park University.

Locations

Parkville campus
The flagship campus of Park University is located in the city of Parkville, Missouri. The Park University Graduate School is located in downtown Kansas City. There are 41 campuses in 22 U.S. states including four campuses in the Kansas City area (downtown Kansas City, Independence, Lenexa, and Parkville) and a campus center in Austin, Texas. Most of the satellite campuses are on or near United States military bases and share quarters with other businesses/organizations.

The  home campus currently has an enrollment of 1,600 students representing 50 states and 106 countries. The entire extended system had an annual student enrollment of 23,000.

Gilbert campus
In 2018, the university opened a campus center in Gilbert, Arizona in the city's Heritage District. Park leased  at the University Building. The university continued to expand the Gilbert campus in 2019, leasing an additional   and extending the initial three-year term to five years with the city. The university continued to expand the Gilbert campus with the addition of college athletics. Initially playing as an independent during the 2019–20 academic year, the university announced membership in the NAIA and California Pacific Conference (Pac West) starting in 2020–21.

Rankings
Ranked second in the “online and nontraditional” category on the Military Times’ "Best for Vets: Colleges 2016" list.
Ranked second among all private colleges/universities in the country with a 9.5 percent annual ROI by 2015 PayScale College ROI Report.
2015-16 Colleges of Distinction list.
 Ranked by U.S. News & World Report as the 126-165 best Midwest college in 2018.

Athletics

Parkville Pirates 
The athletic teams of the Park University main campus are called the Pirates. The university is a member of the National Association of Intercollegiate Athletics (NAIA), primarily competing in the Heart of America Athletic Conference (HAAC) since the 2020–21 academic year. The Pirates previously competed in the American Midwest Conference (AMC) from 2009–10 to 2019–20; which they were a member on a previous stint from 1986–87 to 1993–94; and in the defunct Midlands Collegiate Athletic Conference (MCAC) from 1994–95 to 2008–09.

Park competes in 18 intercollegiate varsity sports: Men's sports include baseball, basketball, cross country, golf, soccer, track & field (indoor and outdoor) and volleyball; while women's sports include basketball, cross country, golf, soccer, softball, track & field (indoor and outdoor) and volleyball; and co-ed sports include eSports.

The Department of Athletics at Park University was led by Claude English, Director of Athletics, who was also the Pirates’ men's basketball coach from 1992 to 2005 and retired in 2021. From 1980 to 1984, English was the head men's basketball coach at his alma mater, the University of Rhode Island, and he played one season in the NBA with the Portland Trail Blazers in 1970–1971.

Seven former Park Pirates compete currently for the Kansas City Comets of the Major Arena Soccer League.

Championships
 2018 Women's Volleyball (NAIA National Champions)
 2017 Men's Volleyball (NAIA Invitational Tournament)
 2014 Women's Volleyball (NAIA National Champions)
 2014 Men's Volleyball (NAIA Invitational Tournament)
 2012 Men's Volleyball (NAIA Invitational Tournament)
 2008 Men's Volleyball (NAIA Invitational Tournament)
 2003 Men's Volleyball (NAIA Invitational Tournament)

Gilbert Buccaneers 
The athletic teams of the Gilbert campus of Park University (Park–Gilbert) are called the Buccaneers. The university added a college athletics program to the Gilbert, Arizona campus center in 2019. After playing as independent institution during the 2019–20 academic year, the university announced membership in the National Association of Intercollegiate Athletics (NAIA), primarily competing in the California Pacific Conference (Cal Pac) starting in the 2020–21 academic year.

Park–Gilbert competes in 15 intercollegiate varsity sports: Men's sports include baseball, basketball, cross country, golf, soccer, track & field (indoor and outdoor) and volleyball; while women's sports include basketball, beach volleyball, cross country, golf, soccer, softball, track & field (indoor and outdoor) and volleyball.

Notable people
Marsia Alexander-Clarke, artist
Vlatko Andonovski - United States Women's National Soccer Team Coach
James J. Barry, Jr. (1969) - former New Jersey General Assemblyman and New Jersey Director of Consumer Affairs
Ralph von Frese (1969) - American geologist
Tsiang Tingfu (Chinese: 蔣廷黻)- Chinese scholar and diplomat. In 1911, he attended the Park Academy
Don H. Compier (1985) - founding Dean of the Community of Christ Seminary
Steve Cox - freelance writer
 John R. Everett  (1942) - President of Hollins College, first Chancellor of the Municipal College System of the City of New York, and President of the New School for Social Research
Maurice Green Olympic Sprinter; world record holder
Melana Scantlin (2002) - former Miss Missouri USA, television personality
Chance Browne - American musician, painter, and cartoonist
Robert E. Hall - eleventh Sergeant Major of the Army
Charles A. Holland, Los Angeles, California, City Council member, 1929–31
James A. Roy - sixteenth Chief Master Sergeant of the Air Force
Edwin Kagin - attorney, founder Camp Quest
George Kelly - American psychologist, therapist and educator
Texe Marrs - American preacher
Cleland Boyd McAfee (1884) - American theologian
Newell A. George - United States Congressman, 1959–1961.
Carl McIntire - radio broadcaster
Stephen M. Veazey - Prophet-President of the Community of Christ
George S. Robb, U.S. Army (1912) - Medal of Honor - World War I 
Lewis Millet, U.S. Army (1964) - Medal of Honor - Korea
Thaddeus J. Martin, U.S. Air Force, Connecticut Adjutant General
David Grace (basketball) UCLA and Oregon State University men's assistant basketball coach (USAF Retired) 
Anthony Melchiorri - Hospitality expert and Travel Channel host
Hollington Tong - transferred to University of Missouri, Republic of China ambassador to the United States
James A. Decker - founder of the Decker Press

Faculty and staff
Stanislav Ioudenitch (Professor of Music and Piano) - Pianist and gold medalist of Van Cliburn International Piano Competition in 2001
Kay Barnes (Senior Director for University Engagement) - Former mayor of Kansas City and candidate for Congress in 2008

References

External links

 
 Park Pirates athletics website
 Park–Gilbert Buccaneers athletics website

 
Private universities and colleges in Missouri
Kansas City metropolitan area
Private universities and colleges in Texas
Educational institutions established in 1875
Buildings and structures in Platte County, Missouri
Education in Platte County, Missouri
1875 establishments in Missouri